Taipei is the capital and a special municipality of Taiwan (officially known as the Republic of China).

Taipei may also refer to:
New Taipei City, formerly Taipei County, a municipality located in northern Taiwan and encircles Taipei
Taipei–Keelung metropolitan area, commonly known as Greater Taipei, including Taipei City, New Taipei City, and Keelung Port
Chinese Taipei, the name used by Taiwan in some international organizations due to political pressure from the People's Republic of China
Taipei (novel), 2013 autobiographical novel by American writer Tao Lin
Microsoft Mahjong, formerly named Taipei, computer game version of mahjong solitaire

See also